Mehman Duyeh (also Romanized as Mehmān Dūyeh) is a village in Damankuh Rural District, in the Central District of Damghan County, Semnan Province, Iran. At the 2006 census, its population was 115, in 39 families.

References 

Populated places in Damghan County